Jean-Guy Paquet,  (born January 5, 1938) is a Canadian scientist, businessman, and former rector of Université Laval.

Born in Montmagny, Quebec, he received a Doctor of Electrical Engineering from Université Laval in 1963. From 1967 to 1969, he was the head of the electrical engineering department at Université Laval. From 1969 to 1972, he was a vice-rector of Université Laval and he was rector from 1977 to 1987. He was the youngest-ever president of a Canadian university and the second engineer to become rector at Laval.

After leaving Université Laval, he became Executive Vice President of The Laurentian Mutual Insurance Company from 1987 to 1988 and was President from 1988 to 1994. Since 1994, he has been President and CEO of the National Optics Institute.

Honours
In 1978, he was made a Fellow of the Royal Society of Canada.
In 1982, he was awarded an honorary Doctor of Sciences from McGill University.
In 1983, he was awarded an honorary Doctor of Law from York University.
In 1984, he was made an Officer of the Order of Canada.
In 1992, he was made an Officer of the National Order of Quebec.
In 1994, he was promoted to Companion of the Order of Canada.
In 2000, he was awarded the Quebec government's Prix Armand-Frappier.
In 2005, he was promoted to Grand Officer of the National Order of Quebec.
he was elected as Fellow of the Canadian Academy of Engineering.

References

1938 births
Academics in Quebec
Canadian academics in engineering
Canadian businesspeople
Canadian university and college chief executives
Companions of the Order of Canada
Fellows of the Royal Society of Canada
Fellows of the Canadian Academy of Engineering
Grand Officers of the National Order of Quebec
Living people
People from Montmagny, Quebec
Université Laval alumni
Rectors of Université Laval
Academic staff of Université Laval